"The Red and Blue" is a popular song of the University of Pennsylvania.

"The Red and Blue", while not the official alma mater of the University of Pennsylvania, is so popular that it is often played in place of it at official university functions.  (The alma mater of the university is Hail, Pennsylvania!.)  The song dates from the end of the 19th century.  Traditionally men would remove their hats for this song and wave them in time to the refrain.  One still sees remnants of this custom when students wave their arms while singing the song's chorus.

The words were written by Harry E. Westervelt (Class of 1898), and the music was composed by William John Goeckel (B.A. 1895, LL.B. 1896).  Goeckel was known among his classmates as a musician and composer and was both a member and leader of the Penn Glee Club during his time at Penn. The song's copyright was originally held by W. H. Boner & Company.

Notes

References
Cheney, Edward Potts. History of the University of Pennsylvania, 1740-1940. (1940.)

External links
University of Pennsylvania Archives
 The Practical Pennsylvanian
 Listen to "The Red and Blue" as performed by the Penn Band

Penn Quakers
University of Pennsylvania